Li Qiang (born 1968) is a Chinese screenwriter.

Filmography

External links
 

Living people
Screenwriters from Henan
1968 births
Writers from Anyang
People's Republic of China writers